La serpenta canta is a live performance album by avant-garde musician Diamanda Galás, released on 24 November 2003 by Mute Records.

Track listing

Personnel
Diamanda Galás – vocals, piano, arrangement
Production and additional personnel
Blaise Dupuy – production, mixing
Rex Ray – design
Austin Young – photography

Release history

References

External links 
 

Diamanda Galás albums
2003 live albums
Mute Records live albums